Pacheykhani is a village located in Pakyong tehsil of Pakyong District in Sikkim, India. The 2011 Census of India recorded it as having a population of 2264 of which 1164 were male and 1100 were female. According to the census 2011 the village code of Pacheykhani is 261340. As per 2019 stats, Pacheykhani villages comes under Rhenock assembly & Sikkim parliamentary constituency.

References 

Villages in Pakyong district
 Pakyong district